Mordellistena longictena is a beetle in the genus Mordellistena of the family Mordellidae. It was described in 1971 by Khalaf.

References

longictena
Beetles described in 1971